Sagfjorden may refer to:

Sagfjorden (Finnmark), a fjord in Sør-Varangen municipality in Finnmark county, Norway
Sagfjorden (Nordland), a fjord in Hamarøy and Steigen municipalities in Nordland county, Norway
Sagfjorden (Sørfold), a fjord in Sørfold municipality in Nordland county, Norway
Sagfjorden (village), a village in Sørfold municipality in Nordland county, Norway